Libyan Revolution may refer to:

 1969 Libyan coup d'état
 Cultural Revolution (Libya), during approximately 1973 to 1977
 Libyan Crisis (2011–present)
 Libyan Civil War (2011)